Valérie Dionne (born July 29, 1980 in Sainte-Foy, Quebec) is a Canadian water polo player.  She is a member of the national women's water polo team and has competed in five juvenile, 15 provincial, and 11 national championships.

In 1999, the FINA Cup team on which she played qualified for the 2000 Summer Olympics, where the team placed fifth in the final results.  She was also part of the bronze medal-winning women's water polo team at the 2001 world championships in Fukuoka, Japan.

See also
 Canada women's Olympic water polo team records and statistics
 List of World Aquatics Championships medalists in water polo

External links
 

1980 births
Water polo players at the 2000 Summer Olympics
Water polo players at the 2004 Summer Olympics
Olympic water polo players of Canada
Canadian female water polo players
French Quebecers
Living people
People from Sainte-Foy, Quebec City
Water polo players from Quebec City
World Aquatics Championships medalists in water polo
Pan American Games silver medalists for Canada
Pan American Games medalists in water polo
Water polo players at the 2003 Pan American Games
Medalists at the 2003 Pan American Games